UFC 181: Hendricks vs. Lawler II was a mixed martial arts event held on December 6, 2014, at Mandalay Bay Events Center in Las Vegas, Nevada.

Background
UFC 181 was the organization's 300th event and was expected to be headlined by a Middleweight Championship bout between the current champion Chris Weidman and top contender Vitor Belfort.  However, on September 22, it was announced that Weidman had suffered a broken hand and the bout was again rescheduled to take place at UFC 184.  The new main event was a Welterweight championship rematch between champion Johny Hendricks and number one contender Robbie Lawler. Their first fight at UFC 171 ended in a unanimous decision victory in favor of the reigning champion.

Co-featured on the card was a Lightweight Championship bout, which also served as the coaches bout for The Ultimate Fighter Season 20, as current champion Anthony Pettis made his first title defense against Gilbert Melendez.

Gian Villante was expected to face Corey Anderson at the event.  However, Villante pulled out of the fight citing an injury and was replaced by Jonathan Wilson. A few days later, it was announced that Wilson was forced out of the fight and undefeated newcomer Justin Jones took his place.

Touted newcomer, Holly Holm was expected to face Raquel Pennington at this event. However, Holm pulled out of the fight in mid-November, citing a neck injury. Holm was replaced by UFC newcomer Ashlee Evans-Smith.

The unique poster and keyart for the event featured a comicbook style fight scene, drawn by noted DC Comics artist Howard Porter. 

During the PPV broadcast, it was announced that former professional wrestler and WWE Champion CM Punk had signed a multi-fight deal and was expected to debut in 2015, but after an injury ultimately debuted in September 2016.

A month subsequent to the event, on January 7, 2015, it was revealed that Ashlee Evans-Smith had failed her post-fight drug test, testing positive for a diuretic. On February 17, the Nevada State Athletic Commission ultimately decided to issue a nine-month suspension and fined her 30 percent of her purse ($2,400). She also was required to pass an additional drug test at the conclusion of her suspension before getting clearance to fight.

Results

Bonus awards
The following fighters were awarded $50,000 bonuses:

Fight of the Night: Sergio Pettis vs. Matt Hobar
Performance of the Night: Anthony Pettis and Josh Samman

Reported payout
The following is the reported payout to the fighters as reported to the Nevada State Athletic Commission. It does not include sponsor money and also does not include the UFC's traditional "fight night" bonuses.
 Robbie Lawler: $220,000 (includes $110,000 win bonus) def. Johny Hendricks: $150,000
 Anthony Pettis: $200,000 (includes $100,000 win bonus) def. Gilbert Melendez: $200,000
 Travis Browne: $100,000 (includes $50,000 win bonus) def. Brendan Schaub: $32,000
 Todd Duffee: $20,000 (includes $10,000 win bonus) def. Anthony Hamilton: $10,000
 Tony Ferguson: $48,000 (includes $24,000 win bonus) def. Abel Trujillo: $14,000
 Urijah Faber: $140,000 (includes $70,000 win bonus) def. Francisco Rivera: $20,000
 Josh Samman: $16,000 (includes $8,000 win bonus) def. Eddie Gordon: $15,000
 Corey Anderson: $30,000 (includes $15,000 win bonus) def. Justin Jones: $8,000
 Raquel Pennington: $20,000 (includes $10,000 win bonus) def. Ashlee Evans-Smith: $8,000
 Sergio Pettis: $30,000 (includes $15,000 win bonus) def. Matt Hobar: $10,000
 Clay Collard: $16,000 (includes $8,000 win bonus) def. Alex White: $8,000

See also
List of UFC events
2014 in UFC

References

Ultimate Fighting Championship events
Mixed martial arts in Las Vegas
2014 in mixed martial arts